Man to Man is an all-talking American pre-Code drama film produced by Warner Bros. in 1930. The film was directed by Allan Dwan and stars Phillips Holmes. The film is based on the story "Barber John's Boy" by Ben Ames Williams.

Plot
John Martin Bolton, a barber, is paroled after serving time for killing a man who murdered his brother. His son, Michael Bolton, ashamed of his father, works at a bank when the older Bolton is paroled. Michael wants nothing to do with John, despite John desiring to establish a relationship. Feeling that people are judging him because of his father, Michael decides to leave town with his girlfriend, Emily. However, Michael is financially unable to marry her. One of Michael's co-workers, Vint Glade, is also in love with Emily. Glade embezzles two thousand dollars from Michael's bank drawer hoping Mike will stand accused, thus ending any future with Emily. Michael assumes his father stole the money as he visited him at the bank earlier in the day. Michael falsely confesses to the embezzlement to prevent his father from returning to prison. At the same time, John confesses to stealing the money to prevent Michael from being charged. Emily suspects Glade stole the money and tricks him into confessing his crime. The Boltons, father and son, are happily reunited.

Cast
 Phillips Holmes as Michael Bolton
 Grant Mitchell as Barber John Martin Bolton
 Lucille Powers as Emily
 Otis Harlan as Rip Henry
 Dwight Frye as Vint Glade
 Russell Simpson as Uncle Cal
 George F. Marion as Banker Jim McCord
 Robert Emmett O'Connor as the Sheriff

Preservation
The film survives complete and has been released by Warner Archive on DVD. A print has also been preserved at the Library of Congress since the 1970s.

References

External links
 
 
 
 

1930 films
1930 drama films
American drama films
American black-and-white films
1930s English-language films
Films based on short fiction
Films directed by Allan Dwan
Warner Bros. films
Films scored by Louis Silvers
1930s American films